Agathotoma neglecta is a species of sea snail, a marine gastropod mollusk in the family Mangeliidae.

Description
The length of the shell varies between 5 mm and 7.5 mm.

The ribs are rounded, approximated, transversely elevately striated. The color of the shell is rusty brown.

Distribution
This species occurs in the Pacific Ocean off Panama.

References

 Adams, C. B. "Catalogue of shells collected at Panama, with notes on synonymy, station, and habitat." Annals of the New York Academy of Sciences 5.1 (1852): 229-549.

External links
  Tucker, J.K. 2004 Catalog of recent and fossil turrids (Mollusca: Gastropoda). Zootaxa 682:1-1295.
 

neglecta
Gastropods described in 1852